Carl Ford could refer to:

Carl W. Ford Jr. (born 1943), American government official
Carl Ford (politician) (born 1957), member of the North Carolina General Assembly
Carl Ford (American football) (born 1980), professional athlete

See also
Carlford Hundred, a division of Suffolk, East Anglia, England
Carlford Division, Suffolk, and electoral division of Suffolk